"Young Blood" is a song written by Doc Pomus along with the songwriting team Jerry Leiber and Mike Stoller that first became a hit by The Coasters in 1957.

Structure

Musically, the song follows a minor blues structure, built mostly around three chords (i7, iv7, V7) except for the bridge (IV, VI, III, V). The lyrical theme is one typical of early rock and roll: boy meets girl, then meets girl's father, who does not approve of boy; so the boy departs, but cannot stop thinking about the girl, declaring "You're the one, you're the one, you're the one."

The Coasters' version
"Young Blood" was originally recorded by The Coasters and released as a single together with "Searchin'" in March 1957 by Atco Records (#6087). This song is compared to the cleaner cut song "Standing on the Corner" from the musical The Most Happy Fella. Their version can also be heard on The Very Best of the Coasters album. It topped Billboard's R&B chart and reached #8 on the Billboard Hot 100.

The Coasters' version is ranked #414 on Rolling Stone'''s list of the 500 Greatest Songs of All Time, the group's only song on the list.

The song was included in the musical revue Smokey Joe's Cafe.

Chart history

Weekly charts

Year-end charts

 Personnel
 Mike Stoller, piano
 Gil Bernal, saxophone
 Barney Kessell, guitar
 probably Adolph Jacobs, guitar
 Ralph Hamilton, bass
 Jesse Sailes, drums
 A.L. "Abe" Stoller, drums
 Joe Olivera, congas
 possibly Chico Guerrero, congas 

The Beatles' cover version

The Beatles played "Young Blood" in their Cavern Club repertoire. It is one of twelve songs recorded by them in July 1962 on a tape, which was re-purchased by Paul McCartney at a Sotheby's auction in 1985.

A previously unreleased version performed by The Beatles (for the BBC radio show Pop Go the Beatles broadcast on June 11, 1963) is included on their album Live at the BBC, released in 1994. It was recorded at the BBC Paris Studio, London on June 1, 1963, and George Harrison is the lead vocalist on this recording; the tempo is moderately fast, considerably faster than in the original.

Personnel
 George Harrison – lead vocals, lead guitar
 John Lennon – backing vocals, rhythm guitar
 Paul McCartney – backing vocals, bass guitar
 Ringo Starr – drums
Personnel per The Beatles Bible

Bad Company cover

Bad Company recorded the song on their 1976 LP Run with the Pack.  It was released as a single, reaching the Top 20 in the United States and the Top 10 in Canada.Cash Box called it "a straight ahead rock -out version of a great song." Record World said that "The group recaptures the flippant attitude of the original with Paul Rodgers providing the dynamic tension."

Chart history

Weekly charts

Year-end charts

Other cover versions
"Young Blood" has been covered by several other artists, including a live performance by Leon Russell at the 1971 Concert for Bangla Desh, who was accompanied by a stageful of world-class musicians including George Harrison, Eric Clapton and Ringo Starr; another performance was included in Russell's three disk set Leon Live; a 1983 version by Beach Boys guitarist Carl Wilson that served as the title track to Youngblood (his second solo album); and a version by Bruce Willis in The Return of Bruno (1987). The Grateful Dead are known to have soundchecked the song. "Young Blood" was performed by Flash Cadillac and the Continental Kids (as "Johnny Fish and the Fins") in a Season Two episode of Happy Days. The song appeared on Jerry Lee Lewis's 1995 album of the same name. For the 1995 Doc Pomus tribute album Till The Night Is Gone - A Tribute To Doc Pomus released by Rhino Records, The Band also recorded a cover, which later appeared on the re-release of their 1996 album High on the Hog''.

The song was sung by season 10 American Idol contestant Scotty McCreery during the Leiber & Stoller week of the competition.

References

Songs written by Jerry Leiber and Mike Stoller
Songs with lyrics by Doc Pomus
1957 singles
The Coasters songs
The Beatles songs
Leon Russell songs
Bad Company songs
Carl Wilson songs
Jerry Lee Lewis songs
Swan Song Records singles
1957 songs
Atco Records singles